Paul J. H. Schoemaker, Ph.D. (born 1949) is an academic, author, and an expert in the fields of strategic management and decision making.

He is listed among the most highly cited scholars globally (top 1%) as measured by academic publications in leading journals of business and economics.

Schoemaker was the founder and executive chairman of a consulting and training firm specializing in strategic management, Decision Strategies International and also the chairman of two family companies (Public Salt Inc in Ohio and Vaessen-Schoemaker BV in the Netherlands).  He also served on the board of the Decision Education Foundation, a philanthropic organization aimed at improving the decision making and judgment skills of adolescents, in associations with high schools around United States.

He currently lives in on the East Coast of USA with his wife, Joyce; they have two children.

Early life and education
He was born and raised in the Netherlands, and he started his studies in physics and mathematics at the University of Groningen, Netherlands. He graduated magna cum laude from the University of Notre Dame with a B.S. in physics in 1972. Later, he received an M.B.A. in Finance, an M.A. in Management and a Ph.D. in Decision Sciences, all three degrees from the Wharton School at the University of Pennsylvania.

Professional life 
In 1975, he started his professional life  as a Lecturer of Management at the Wharton School and later in 1977 served there as an assistant Professor of Management. For over twelve years (starting 1979), he served as a full-time professor in the Graduate School of Business at the University of Chicago, specializing in strategy and decision sciences.

During 1982-84 he took an extended sabbatical with the strategic planning group of Royal Dutch Shell in London, where he helped pioneer scenario planning.

Prof. Schoemaker has served as Research Director of the Mack Institute for Innovation Management at the Wharton School of the University of Pennsylvania, where he remains as a senior fellow.

He was also the founder and Executive Chairman of Decision Strategies International, a consulting and training firm specializing in strategic management, executive development and multi-media software.

Paul Schoemaker has been an active private investor in new technology-based ventures and served on the board of directors of the Decision Education Foundation, a philanthropic organization aimed at improving the decision making and judgment skills of adolescents, in associations with high schools around United States.

Personal life 
He lives with his wife Joyce in Villanova, Pennsylvania and Delray Beach, Florida; they have two children. His hobbies include tennis, golf and piano.

His brother Hubert Schoemaker was a co-founder and the president of the biotech company Centocor.

Publications
Schoemaker’s articles have appeared in the Harvard Business Review, The Journal of Economic Literature and the Journal of Mathematical Psychology, as well as numerous other journals. A selection of articles and books  can be found below:

Books (author)
J. Edward Russo, Paul J.H. Schoemaker (1990); Decision Traps; Simon & Schuster; 
Paul R. Kleindorfer, Howard C. Kunreuther, Paul J.H. Schoemaker (1993); Decision Sciences; Cambridge University Press; 
George S. Day, Paul J. H. Schoemaker, Robert E. Gunther (2000); Wharton On Managing Emerging Technologies; Wiley ; 
J. Edward Russo, Paul J.H. Schoemaker (2001); Winning Decisions; Crown Business; 
Paul J.H. Schoemaker, Robert E. Gunther (2002); Profiting from Uncertainty; Simon & Schuster; 
George S. Day, Paul J.H. Schoemaker (2006); Peripheral Vision; Harvard Business School Press; 
Paul J.H. Schoemaker, Joyce A. Schoemaker (2009); Chips, Clones and Living Beyond Hundred; FT Press; 
Paul J.H. Schoemaker (2011); Brilliant Mistakes: Finding Success on the Far Side of Failure; Wharton Digital Press; 
Krupp, Steven and Paul J.H. Schoemaker, Winning the Long Game: How Strategic Leaders Shape the Future, Public Affairs Imprint of Perseus, Dec 2014.
Day, George S. and Schoemaker, Paul J.H., See Sooner–Act Faster: How Vigilant Leaders Thrive in an Era of Digital Turbulence, MIT Press, 2019. 
Schoemaker, Paul J.H., Advanced Introduction to Scenario Planning, Edward Elgar Publishing, UK, 2022;
Articles
Paul J.H. Schoemaker (November 1995); Scenario Planning: "A Tool for Strategic Thinking”, Sloan Management Review
George S. Day, Paul J.H. Schoemaker (November 2005); Scanning the Periphery;  Harvard Business Review
Paul J.H. Schoemaker, Robert E. Gunther  (June 2006); The Wisdom of Deliberate Mistakes;  Harvard Business Review
Paul J.H. Schoemaker  (March 2012); 6 Habits of True Strategic Thinkers;  Inc.com
Schoemaker, P.J.H., Steve Krupp and Samantha Howland, “Strategic Leadership:The Essential Skills” Harvard Business Review, Jan/Feb 2013, 131-134
Paul J.H. Schoemaker  (April 2012); Why Failure Is the Foundation of Innovation;  Inc.com
Schoemaker, Paul J.H and Philip E. Tetlock “Superforecasting: How to Upgrade Your Company’s Judgment,” Harvard Business Review, May 2016, pp 72-78
Schoemaker, Paul J.H., Sohvi Heaton, and David Teece “Innovation, Dynamic Capabilities and Leadership,” California Management Review, 2018, Vol. 61(1) pp 15-42. 
Paul J.H. Schoemaker and George S. Day, “Preparing Organizations for Greater Turbulence,” California Management Review, Summer 2021, Vol 63, Issue 4

References

External links
Official website of Paul Schoemaker

1949 births
Living people
Dutch academics
University of Chicago faculty
University of Notre Dame alumni
Wharton School of the University of Pennsylvania alumni
University of Pennsylvania faculty
Dutch expatriates in the United States
People from Deventer